The Headless Woman is a 2008 Argentine psychological thriller art film written and directed by Lucrecia Martel and starring María Onetto. The plot revolves around Vero (short for Verónica) (Onetto), who hits something while driving on a deserted road near Salta. Not being sure if she has hit a person or an animal, she drives off, and becomes increasingly mentally disturbed.

The film premiered in competition at the 2008 Cannes Film Festival on May 21, 2008. It opened nationwide on August 21, 2008, after being screened at the Locarno International Film Festival earlier that month. While The Headless Woman was mostly lauded by critics for its cinematography and social commentary, others were critical towards the film's slow pace and lack of clear narrative. In 2016, the film was ranked No. 89th on BBC's list of the 100 greatest films of the 21st century. In 2022, it was selected as the 24th greatest film of Argentine cinema in a poll organized in 2022 by the specialized magazines La vida útil, Taipei and La tierra quema, which was presented at the Mar del Plata International Film Festival.

Plot
This film is centered around Verónica ("Vero"), an Argentinean bourgeois woman, and how her life slowly twists out of control after she thinks perhaps she struck and killed a person with her car. As Vero is driving, she is distracted by her cell phone and, as she looks down to answer it, her car hits something. She peers in the rear-view mirror, collects herself, and drives away. A non-point-of-view shot of Véro driving away from the scene shows a dog lying dead on the ground.

Although Vero seems indifferent about the situation, it is clear that the incident deeply disturbs her. She acts clumsy and out of place. When she informs her husband Marcos that she thinks she may have run over someone, she insists upon returning to the scene of the accident; they see something on the side of the road, which her husband insists is merely a dog, though Vero is even more unsure than before. Later, the body of a dark-skinned servant's child is recovered from a canal, right above the spot where the accident occurred. Her niece Candita, who has a crush on Vero, tells her that she wants to know more about "that boy who was murdered," but Vero insists that the boy was drowned: "The papers say he was drowned."

Still privately unconvinced, in an attempt to jog back her memory after the accident, Vero revisits a hospital where she had X-rays taken and a hotel where she had a post-accident tryst with her lover Juan Manuel. She discovers that there are no records of her visits to a hospital (perhaps scrubbed by her brother, who works there) and the hotel where she stayed (perhaps scrubbed by Juan Manuel). Finally, she attends a bourgeois party in a hotel, smiling weakly and dazedly as people enter in and out of the busy frame.

Cast
 María Onetto as Verónica ("Vero")
 Claudia Cantero as Josefina
 César Bordón as Marcos
 Daniel Genoud as Juan Manuel
 Guillermo Arengo as Marcelo
 Inés Efron as Candita
 Alicia Muxo as Prima Rosita		
 Pía Uribelarrea as Prima Tere
 María Vaner as Tía Lala

Reception

Critical response

The Headless Woman garnered mostly positive reviews from film critics. On review aggregator website Rotten Tomatoes, the film holds a 75% approval rating based on 52 reviews, with a rating average of 6.89 out of 10. The site's consensus states: "Careful and slight, Lucretia Martel's Headless Woman doesn't fit neatly into a clear storyline, but supports itself with ethereal visuals." At Metacritic, which assigns a weighted mean rating out of 0–100 reviews from film critics, the film has a score of 81 based on 12 reviews, classified as a universally acclaimed film.

Accolades

 Each year is linked to the article about the awards held that year.

See also

 Mental illness in film

References

Further reading

External links 
 
 
 La mujer sin cabeza at LUMIERE
 
 
 
 

2008 psychological thriller films
2008 films
2008 LGBT-related films
Argentine LGBT-related films
Argentine mystery thriller films
Argentine thriller drama films
French psychological thriller films
French mystery television series
French thriller drama films
Italian mystery thriller films
Italian thriller drama films
Italian psychological thriller films
2000s Spanish-language films
Spanish mystery thriller films
Spanish thriller drama films
Films produced by Agustín Almodóvar
Films directed by Lucrecia Martel
Focus Features films
Warner Bros. films
El Deseo films
2000s French films
2000s Spanish films
2000s Italian films
2000s Argentine films
Spanish psychological thriller films
Argentine psychological thriller films